is a former Japanese football player.

Playing career
Horiike was born in Shizuoka Prefecture on May 24, 1971. After graduating from Keio University, he joined Japan Football League club Tokyo Gas (later FC Tokyo) in 1994. He played as regular goalkeeper from first season. The club results rose year by year and won the champions in 1998. The club was promoted to new league J2 League from 1999. In 1999 season, although he played as regular goalkeeper for 16 matches in a row from opening match, he injured his shoulder and left the match in 16th match against Consadole Sapporo. After the injury, he could not play at all in the match behind Takayuki Suzuki. The club won the 2nd place in 1999 and was promoted to J1 League from 2000. However the club gained Yoichi Doi and Horiike could hardly play in the match behind Doi. On July 8, he played from the 86th minute as substitute goalkeeper against Kawasaki Frontale. This match was his only match in J1 League and he retired end of 2000 season.

Club statistics

References

External links

1971 births
Living people
Keio University alumni
Association football people from Shizuoka Prefecture
Japanese footballers
J1 League players
J2 League players
Japan Football League (1992–1998) players
FC Tokyo players
Association football goalkeepers